Buddy Holly is the debut studio album by Buddy Holly. It was released by Coral Records on February 20, 1958. The album collects Holly's four hit singles released on the Coral label; "Words of Love", "Peggy Sue", "I'm Gonna Love You Too", and "Rave On!". The backing group was Buddy Holly's band, the Crickets.

Release history 
Some re-releases include the tracks from Holly's next single, "Early in the Morning" backed with "Now We're One", and "Take Your Time", the B-side of the single "Rave On".

It was re-released again with different cover art in 2015 by WaxTime Records on 180 Gram Vinyl. This edition included the original liner notes and two extra tracks: "Now We're One" (issued as the B-side of Holly's "Early in the Morning") and "Ting-A-Ling".  It also included new liner notes written by Gary Blailock in September 2014.

Track listing 

1999 Bonus tracks

Personnel
The Crickets
 Buddy Holly - vocals, guitar
 Joe B. Mauldin - bass
 Jerry Allison - drums
 Niki Sullivan - rhythm guitar (track 6)

Additional personnel
 Norman Petty - organ (track 5), piano (track 11)
 Vi Petty - piano (tracks 3, 5, 6, 8), celesta (track 7)
 C. W. Kendall Jr. - piano (tracks 3, 10, 12)
 Al Caiola - guitar (track 11)
 Donald Arnone - guitar (track 11)
 William Marihe - backing vocals (track 11)
 Robert Bollinger - backing vocals (track 11)
 Robert Harter - backing vocals (track 11)
 Merrill Ostrus - backing vocals (track 11)
 Abby Hoffer - backing vocals (track 11)

Charts
Single

References

External links
 

Buddy Holly albums
1958 debut albums
Albums produced by Bob Thiele
Brunswick Records albums
Albums produced by Norman Petty